Dasarth Debbarma (2 February 1916 – 14 October 1998) was an Indian Communist politician in the Indian state of Tripura. He was chief minister of Tripura from 1993 to 1998. He was a leader of the Ganamukti Parishad (Tripura State Indigenous People's Liberation Council) and the Communist Party of India (Marxist). He was also the vice-president of All India Kisan Sabha and first and yet only Tiprasa chief minister of Tripura.

Early life
Dasaratha Debbarma, a legendary leader of the Indian Communist movement was born on 2 February 1916 into a poor peasant family in remote Boltali village in the present day Khowai district of Tripura. Since childhood, Dasaratha was very eager to obtain education but it was hardly affordable for his poor family to send him to town for education. Due to his indomitable eagerness, he was later admitted in Khowai primary school. And after he passed matriculation examinations, he was admitted in Brindaban College of Habiganj of Sylhet District under erstwhile East Bengal, as Tripura had no college then. After passing Intermediate and BA, Debbarma got admitted in Calcutta University for MA. Simultaneously, he pursued a law degree.

In 1940, CPI Comilla District Committee working under the Bengal Provincial Committee initiated formation of a Party unit in Tripura. The first unit of the Party in Agartala was formed with some local youths including Comrade Biren Datta who, besides Debbarma, was elected to the first Lok Sabha from Tripura. The Agartala Branch of CPI first started building up mass organisations with the working people of Agartala, mostly Bengalis. It was decided that an organisation would be formed with the core objective of spreading education among the tribal people. Dasarath Debbarma was contacted in Kolkata and apprised of the mission. Soon, he came to Tripura, leaving his post-graduate study never to go back again.

Political career
In 1948, he formed Ganamukti Parishad, which was engaged in an armed struggle from 1948 to 1950. In 1950, he along with his followers, joined the Communist Party of India. He became a member of the central committee of the party in 1951. After the party split in 1964, he joined Communist Party of India (Marxist). In 1964, he founded the Tripura Rajya Upajati Ganamukti Parishad, a frontal organization of CPI(M). 
In the heady days of the 1930s and 40s, Deb completed his education from Sylhet and later Calcutta. He took to spreading education among tribal through the Janasikhya Samiti.

He was elected to the Lok Sabha in 1952, 1957, 1962 and 1971 from Tripura East constituency. In 1978, he was elected for the first time in Tripura Vidhan Sabha from Ramchandraghat constituency and became the Minister for Education in the first Left Front government. He was the deputy chief minister in the second Left Front government from 1983 to 1988. In 1988, he became the secretary of the state unit of CPI(M).  After the defeat of the Left Front in 1988 elections, he became the leader of the opposition in Tripura Vidhan Sabha from 1988 to 1993.

On 10 April 1993 he became the chief minister of the third Left Front government. He was in office till 11 March 1998. He declined to contest the Vidhan Sabha election in 1998 on health grounds.

Works
Mukti Parishader Itikatha
Samantatantrik Byabasthar Biruddhe Mukti Parishader Sangram
Kokborder jonyo bangla horof keno chai
kokborok lekhar pothrekha

Notes

Chief Ministers of Tripura
1916 births
1998 deaths
Tripuri people
India MPs 1952–1957
India MPs 1957–1962
India MPs 1962–1967
India MPs 1971–1977
People from West Tripura district
Lok Sabha members from Tripura
People from Khowai district
Chief ministers from Communist Party of India (Marxist)
Communist Party of India (Marxist) politicians from Tripura
Tripura politicians
Indians imprisoned during the Emergency (India)
Tripura MLAs 1977–1983
Tripura MLAs 1983–1988
Tripura MLAs 1988–1993
Tripura MLAs 1993–1998